Events from the year 1981 in Kuwait.

Incumbents
Emir: Jaber Al-Ahmad Al-Jaber Al-Sabah
Prime Minister: Saad Al-Salim Al-Sabah

Events

Births

 28 April – Shehab Kankoune, footballer.
 25 May – Nawaf Al Khaldi, footballer.
 27 May – Saud Alsanousi, novelist and journalist.
 7 June – Ema Shah, singer.
 15 October – Jarah Al Ateeqi, footballer.
 3 November – Waleed Ali, footballer.
 10 November – Mohamed Jarragh, footballer.

References

 
Kuwait
Kuwait
Years of the 20th century in Kuwait
1980s in Kuwait